A candidate is a person or thing seeking or being considered for some kind of position:

Candidate may also refer to:
 Candidate solution, in mathematics
 Candidates Tournament, a qualification event for the World Chess Championship
 Candidate (degree)

Film
 The Candidate (1959 film), an Argentine drama film
 The Candidate (1964 film) by Robert Angus, aka Party Girls for the Candidate, aka The Playmates and the Candidate
 The Candidate (1972 film) by Michael Ritchie, with Robert Redford
 The Candidate (1980 film) by Stefan Aust, Alexander Kluge, Volker Schlöndorff, Alexander von Eschwege, German title: Der Kandidat
 The Candidate (1998 film), Taiwanese film by Neil Peng
 The Candidate (2008 film) by Kasper Barfoed, Danish title: Kandidaten
 Candidate (2013 film) by Jonáš Karásek, Slovak title: Kandidát
 The Realm (2018 film) by Rodrigo Sorogoyen, also known as The Candidate, Spanish title: El reino

Television
 "The Candidate" (Arrow), an episode of Arrow
 The Candidate (TV series), an Afghan TV series supported by the CEPPS agreement
 "The Candidate" (Lost), an episode of the sixth and final season of the television drama Lost
 "The Candidate" (Frasier), an episode of Frasier
 La candidata, a Mexican telenovela
 El Candidato (2020), known as The Candidate in English, a Mexican TV series.

Music
 Candidate (band), a British rock group
 The Candidate (album), a 1979 album by Steve Harley
 "Candidate" (David Bowie song)
 "Candidate" (Joy Division song)

See also 
 Candidate of Sciences, a post-graduate scientific degree in many former Eastern Bloc countries